Pan.Thy.Monium was a Swedish avant-garde metal band formed and led by Dan Swanö with several members from another project of his, Edge of Sanity. The group disbanded in 1996, after recording Khaooohs and Kon-Fus-Ion.

Last known line-up
Derelict (Robert Karlsson): vocals
Winter (Benny Larsson): drums, percussion, violin
Day DiSyraah (Dan Swanö): bass, keyboards, effects
Mourning (Robert Ivarsson): rhythm guitar
Äag aka Tom Nouga (Dag Swanö): lead guitar, organ, baritone saxophone

Discography

Demos
...Dawn (1990)

Albums
Dawn of Dreams (1992)
Khaooohs (1993)
Khaooohs and Kon-Fus-Ion (1996)

EPs
Dream II (1991)

Compilations
Dawn of Dream+Khaooohs (2001)
...Dawn+Dream II (2010)

External links
Relapse Records page

Avant-garde metal musical groups
Swedish progressive metal musical groups
Relapse Records artists
Musical groups established in 1990
Musical groups disestablished in 1996